Leask v Commonwealth (1996) 187 CLR 579 is a High Court of Australia case that discussed the role of proportionality in the Australian Constitution.

Background 

The act under question was the Financial Transactions Reports Act 1988 (Cth), which imposed an obligation on 'cash dealers' to report all transactions above $10,000 to a statutory authority. It was also an offence if it could be proved the transactions were designed to avoid tracking. The offence was a strict liability offence.

Decision

Incidentality 

Once there is a sufficient connection between the Act and the head of power, proportionality is irrelevant for non-purposive powers. Whether or not there is a sufficient connection does not rely on the desirability of the legislation.

Proportionality 

It was noted that the law was disproportionate to the currency and coins power (section 51(xii)), and that it was an inappropriate means to achieving the end. (Proportionality may be examined by testing if the law is appropriate and adapted to some means.) Dawson J noted that the test of whether the measures in a law are appropriate and necessary to achieve certain objectives, while used in Europe, was irrelevant for the Australian Constitution; "[t]hey are essentially political rather than judicial considerations".

Re Dingjan; Ex parte Wagner described the process by which it is determined whether a law is "with respect to" a section 51 head of power:
 By reference to the rights, powers, liabilities, duties and privileges which it creates (Commonwealth v Tasmania)
 A judgment as to the connection of this characterisation to the head of power

Thus, the connection involves some kind of degree, but once it has been established, it does not matter whether the law is appropriate for its aims.

However, proportionality may be relevant, and a law not invalid, if an immunity conferred by a limitation of a power is affected incidentally by the achievement of a legitimate end.

See also 

 Australian constitutional law

References 

 Winterton, G. et al. Australian federal constitutional law: commentary and materials, 1999. LBC Information Services, Sydney.

External links 
 Full text of the decision

High Court of Australia cases
1996 in Australian law
Australian constitutional law
Proportionality in the Australian Constitution cases
1996 in case law